Daniel Patrick Chick (born 10 February 1976) is a former Australian rules footballer who played for Hawthorn and the West Coast Eagles in the Australian Football League. Chick is also well known for having a finger amputated in 2002 so he could continue playing football.

Hawthorn career 
Daniel Chick was drafted by Hawthorn from East Fremantle with pick #25 in 1995. Hawthorn received the pick from Adelaide in exchange for Darren Jarman. Chick made his debut for the Hawks in Round 1 1996, in a win over Fitzroy. Chick missed only one game in the 1996 season, quickly establishing himself as a tough and versatile half forward, renowned for his strong tackling.

He won the Peter Crimmins Trophy in 2000.

He played in the 2001 Semi Final against  after learning that a relative had been killed in the attack on the World Trade Center.

After Chick's brother Justin died from an allergic reaction Chick felt unsatisfied at Hawthorn and expressed his intentions to return to his home state. Hawthorn traded him to the West Coast Eagles for first round draft pick Luke Brennan (no. 8).

West Coast career 
Chick returned to Perth as part of a trade deal to play with West Coast for 2003.

He eventually became a versatile tagger, shutting down many opponents.

However his 2003 season was impaired by anterior cruciate ligament injuries and eventual surgery.

2004 and 2005 were better years where Chick became a key contributor.

Season 2006 included many highlights for Chick, including 5 goals against Essendon in round 8. Chick played a vital role in the 2006 AFL Grand Final win. During the last quarter, Chick smothered an attempted kick by Sydney's Ryan O'Keefe and—via the collection, handball, and shepherd—set up a pivotal Adam Hunter goal.

In September 2007, West Coast released a statement of their intent to delist Chick at the end of October 2007.

Finger amputation

In January 2002, Chick made headlines when he had his left-ring finger surgically amputated following chronic dislocation.

Chick was unaffected by the missing finger throughout the rest of his career.

Other 
After it became apparent that no other club would pick Chick up for the upcoming season, effectively terminating his AFL career, he signed with WAFL premiers, Subiaco.

Chick was named in Warwick Cappers "Party" team of the century alongside Ben Cousins, Michael Gardiner, Lance Franklin, Shane Crawford, Jason Akermanis and Fraser Gehrig.

In February 2010 Chick was fined $7000 with $1000 costs in the Perth Magistrates Court after pleading guilty to importing performance and image enhancing steroids from Thailand.  He was charged after being caught with nine vials and a number of pills of anabolic steroids concealed in his luggage after landing at Perth Airport on 9 October 2009.

In January 2013 Chick launched a Defamation case against AFL and Kim Hagdorn, and Sports News First .,

In 2014 Chick represented the Malaysian Warriors Australian Rules Football Club within the AFL Asia competition, with his debut against Vietnam resulting in one goal.

Statistics

|- style="background-color: #EAEAEA"
! scope="row" style="text-align:center" | 1996
|style="text-align:center;"|
| 27 || 22 || 14 || 5 || 153 || 102 || 255 || 59 || 43 || 0.6 || 0.2 || 7.0 || 4.6 || 11.6 || 2.7 || 2.0
|-
! scope="row" style="text-align:center" | 1997
|style="text-align:center;"|
| 17 || 21 || 28 || 20 || 150 || 69 || 219 || 57 || 58 || 1.3 || 1.0 || 7.1 || 3.3 || 10.4 || 2.7 || 2.8
|- style="background:#eaeaea;"
! scope="row" style="text-align:center" | 1998
|style="text-align:center;"|
| 17 || 20 || 26 || 9 || 173 || 90 || 263 || 50 || 64 || 1.3 || 0.5 || 8.7 || 4.5 || 13.2 || 2.5 || 3.2
|-
! scope="row" style="text-align:center" | 1999
|style="text-align:center;"|
| 17 || 20 || 25 || 13 || 149 || 80 || 229 || 44 || 36 || 1.3 || 0.7 || 7.5 || 4.0 || 11.5 || 2.2 || 1.8
|- style="background:#eaeaea;"
! scope="row" style="text-align:center" | 2000
|style="text-align:center;"|
| 17 || 24 || 11 || 3 || 265 || 121 || 386 || 84 || 87 || 0.5 || 0.1 || 11.0 || 5.0 || 16.1 || 3.5 || 3.6
|-
! scope="row" style="text-align:center" | 2001
|style="text-align:center;"|
| 17 || 20 || 24 || 10 || 220 || 91 || 311 || 57 || 79 || 1.2 || 0.5 || 11.0 || 4.6 || 15.6 || 2.9 || 4.0
|- style="background:#eaeaea;"
! scope="row" style="text-align:center" | 2002
|style="text-align:center;"|
| 17 || 22 || 31 || 17 || 178 || 83 || 261 || 47 || 104 || 1.4 || 0.8 || 8.1 || 3.8 || 11.9 || 2.1 || 4.7
|- 
! scope="row" style="text-align:center" | 2003
|style="text-align:center;"|
| 17 || 18 || 12 || 10 || 155 || 72 || 227 || 45 || 86 || 0.7 || 0.6 || 8.6 || 4.0 || 12.6 || 2.5 || 4.8
|- style="background:#eaeaea;"
! scope="row" style="text-align:center" | 2004
|style="text-align:center;"|
| 17 || 18 || 6 || 2 || 107 || 94 || 201 || 30 || 52 || 0.3 || 0.1 || 5.9 || 5.2 || 11.2 || 1.7 || 2.9
|- 
! scope="row" style="text-align:center" | 2005
|style="text-align:center;"|
| 17 || 25 || 14 || 5 || 189 || 107 || 296 || 66 || 84 || 0.6 || 0.2 || 7.6 || 4.3 || 11.8 || 2.6 || 3.4
|- style="background:#eaeaea;"
! scope="row" style="text-align:center" | 2006
|style="text-align:center;"|
| 17 || 23 || 14 || 5 || 132 || 108 || 240 || 47 || 71 || 0.6 || 0.2 || 5.7 || 4.7 || 10.4 || 2.0 || 3.1
|- 
! scope="row" style="text-align:center" | 2007
|style="text-align:center;"|
| 17 || 19 || 5 || 3 || 96 || 128 || 224 || 41 || 61 || 0.3 || 0.2 || 5.1 || 6.7 || 11.8 || 2.2 || 3.2
|- class="sortbottom"
! colspan=3| Career
! 252
! 210
! 102
! 1967
! 1145
! 3112
! 627
! 825
! 0.8
! 0.4
! 7.8
! 4.5
! 12.3
! 2.5
! 3.3
|}

References

External links 

East Fremantle Football Club players
Hawthorn Football Club players
West Coast Eagles players
West Coast Eagles Premiership players
Australian amputees
Sportspeople with limb difference
Australian rules footballers from Western Australia
Peter Crimmins Medal winners
People from Northampton, Western Australia
Subiaco Football Club players
1976 births
Living people
Western Australian State of Origin players
Australia international rules football team players
One-time VFL/AFL Premiership players